Portland State University (PSU) is a public research university in Portland, Oregon. It was founded in 1946 as a post-secondary educational institution for World War II veterans. It evolved into a four-year college over the following two decades and was granted university status in 1969. It is one of two public universities in Oregon that are located in a large city. It is governed by a board of trustees. PSU is classified among "R2: Doctoral Universities – High research activity".

Portland State is composed of seven constituent colleges, offering undergraduate degrees in one hundred twenty-three fields, and postgraduate degrees in one hundred seventeen fields. Schools at Portland State include the School of Business Administration, College of Education, School of Social Work, College of Urban and Public Affairs, College of the Arts, Maseeh College of Engineering and Computer Science, and the College of Liberal Arts and Sciences. The athletic teams are known as the Portland State Vikings with school colors of green and white. Teams compete at the NCAA Division I Level, primarily in the Big Sky Conference.

History

1946–1964: Establishment
Portland State University was established as the Vanport Extension Center in June 1946, founded by Stephen Edward Epler, a native of Iowa. Epler graduated from Cotner College in Lincoln, Nebraska, and later Columbia University in New York City, before joining the army to fight in World War II. After returning to the United States after serving, Epler became a veterans' counselor in Oregon's General Extension Division in Portland. The Vanport Extension Center was conceived by Epler in order to satisfy the demand for higher education in Portland for returning World War II veterans, taking advantage of the G.I. Bill. The G.I. Bill was passed in 1944 to provide college, high school or vocational education for returning World War II veterans, as well as one year of unemployment compensation.

The first classes were held in the Vanport Junior High School and given its location in the Columbia River floodplain was promptly given the colloquial title, "The U by the Slough." This first summer session had 221 students, and tuition and fees were $50. Over 1,410 students registered for the 1946 fall term, which was delayed until October 7, 1946, due to a lack of space. Since the population in Vanport was decreasing after World War II, the extension center was able to use buildings created for other purposes: two childcare centers, a recreation building with three classrooms, and a shopping center, which required substantial modification to house a library, offices, and six classrooms. In addition to Vanport Junior High School, Lincoln and Jefferson high schools were used after school hours, as well as the University of Oregon's dental and medical schools, located in Portland.

Following the May 30 Vanport Flood of 1948, the college became known as "the college that wouldn't die" for refusing to close after the flood. The term was coined by Lois Hennessy, a student who wrote about the college and the flood in the Christian Science Monitor, though students nicknamed the school "The college without a future."  (Hennessy was the mother of poet Gary Snyder.)  The school occupied Grant High School in the summer of 1948, then to hastily converted buildings at the Oregon Shipyard, known as the Oregon Ship. In 1953, the school moved to downtown Portland and occupied the vacated buildings of Lincoln High School on SW Broadway Street, including Lincoln Hall, then known as "Old Main."

The school changed its name to the Portland State Extension Center between December 1951 and February 1952. In 1955, the Center changed its name to Portland State College to mark its maturation into a four-year degree-granting institution, although severe restrictions were placed on the college's curriculum and growth. Epler, who had campaigned for a presidency role at the college, was not elected by the State Board. Without an administrative stake in the college, Epler left and accepted presidency at Reedley College in California. By 1956, the veteran population at the college had subsided, and baby food was no longer stocked in the bookstore.

1965–2000: Expansion and development
A team from Portland State entered and won the 1965 General Electric College Bowl the nationally televised quiz show that pitted teams of college students from across the country against each other. The team knocked off its competitors for five consecutive weeks, retiring as champions, and setting a new record for total points scored. The university's Smith Memorial Student Union building was named after team member Michael J. Smith, who competed in the tournament while suffering from cystic fibrosis and died in 1968.

Architecture at the university was a topic of controversy in its early stages. In 1968, incoming university president Gregory Wolfe commented that the buildings were distressing evidence of Stalinist cubism on campus, although urban renewal chairman Ira Keller found them to be "perfectly lovely." Portland State University's growth for the next couple of decades was restricted under the Oregon University System's 1929 ruling that no public university or college in Oregon could duplicate the programs offered by another, with grandfathered exclusions for the University of Oregon and Oregon State University.
Nevertheless, graduate programs were added in 1961 and doctoral programs were added in 1972. The institution was granted university status by the Oregon State Board of Higher Education in 1969, becoming Portland State University.

In 1993, PSU did away with the traditional undergraduate distribution system and adopted a new interdisciplinary general education program known as University Studies. The University Studies curriculum consists of one year of required freshman inquiry courses followed by a year of sophomore inquiry, junior cluster courses (which serve as upperclassmen electives) and, finally, a senior capstone; the senior capstone course serves as a "culmination of the University Studies program," and requires students to take part in a community-based project of their choosing, often followed by a public presentation on their experience in the project. The program garnered national attention for its learning communities, service-learning, senior capstones, and successful retention of first-year students. U.S. News & World Report has on multiple occasions listed University Studies as a "Program to Look For". In 1995, two years before his death, the university honored Stephen Epler for his contributions to the university's origins.

2001–present
In 2003 Portland State was approved to award degrees in Black Studies. That same year the university opened a center housed in the Native American Student and Community Center. In 2004 Fariborz Maseeh, an alumnus of the university, donated, through The Massiah Foundation, $8 million to the College of Engineering and Computer Science. The college was renamed the Maseeh College of Engineering and Computer Science. This was the largest single donation to the university at the time and this gift along with others led to, in May 2006, the opening of a new engineering building, the "Northwest Center for Engineering, Science and Technology", which houses much of the college. The LEED gold-certified engineering building reflects the university's increased emphasis on engineering, science and technology. The  facility includes classrooms, offices and 41 research and teaching labs.

In 2006, Portland State was declared to be the nation's first Salmon Safe University by the nonprofit organization Salmon Safe. The award was given to recognize campus-wide efforts toward environmental sustainability by treating storm water runoff before it reaches the local watershed.

On June 3, 2008, the Jimmy and Rosalynn Carter Partner Foundation announced Portland State as the recipient of The Jimmy and Rosalynn Carter Partnership Award for Campus-Community Collaboration for their Watershed Stewardship Program. The program has led over 27,000 community volunteers donating a quarter of a million hours to install 80,000 plants and restore  of watershed along  of river. Individual projects have been led and supported by 700 students working as part of class projects, resulting in two master's theses and three research articles. In 2017, the university was once again recognized by U.S. News as one of the top 10 most innovative universities in the country, in a list of "schools that the public should be watching because of the cutting-edge changes being made on their campuses. PSU has been on the most innovative list for three consecutive years."

In August 2020, citing the George Floyd protests as well as the killing of a Black man by PSU (campus police) officers in 2018, university President Stephen Percy announced that the campus police will no longer carry guns on patrol (though firearms will still be stored in the public safety office for use in case of an active shooter situation). In case of dangerous calls, Portland police will respond instead. The policy took effect on September 1, 2021.

Founders and presidents 
Founders and presidents of the university include:

 Stephen E. Epler (Vanport Extension Center), 1946-1952
 John F. Cramer, 1955-1958
 Brandford P. Millar, 1959-1968
 Gregory B. Wolfe, 1968-1974
 Joseph C. Blumel, 1974-1986
 Natale A. Sicuro, 1986-1988
 Roger N. Edgington (Interim President), 1988-1990
 Judith A. Ramaley, 1990-1997
 Daniel O. Bernstine, 1997-2007
 Michael F. Reardon (Interim President), 2007-2008
 Wim Wiewel, 2008-2017
 Rahmat Shoureshi, 2017-2019
 Stephen Percy (Interim President 2019-2020), 2020-present

Academics

Portland State offers undergraduate degrees in one hundred twenty-three fields, and postgraduate degrees in one hundred and seventeen. The university has increasingly added more doctoral programs as it has grown from its original mission as a liberal arts undergraduate college into a more broad-based research university. Recently added fields where doctorates are awarded are mathematics, biology, chemistry, applied physics, computer science, applied psychology, engineering & technology management, mechanical engineering, and sociology. Graduate education is now offered in more than 70 master's degree programs, more than 30 graduate certificate programs, and 20 doctoral programs.

In 2006, the College of Urban and Public Affairs established Portland State University's first fully online degree. The Division of Criminology and Criminal Justice offers an online bachelor's degree in criminology and criminal justice as well as certificates in Advanced Crime Analysis, Criminal Behavior, Leadership in Criminal Justice, and a post-baccalaureate certificate in Criminology and Criminal Justice. Portland State awarded a total of 6,050 degrees for the 2014–15 academic year, including 4,250 bachelor's degrees, 1,725 master's degrees and 75 doctoral degrees.

Admissions
According to the U.S. News & World Report and Forbes, the university's acceptance rate was 95% in 2012, which was considered selective for a state university. According to Forbes in their 2015 survey, the university's acceptance rate was 61%. Portland State also has a dual enrollment agreement with Portland Community College and Clackamas Community College that allows students of the two schools to take courses at either school, and also complies with the Associate of Arts Oregon Transfer Degree curriculum (A.A.O.T.), which allows accepted students who have completed two year associate degrees at an Oregon community college to transfer into the university at junior level.

Colleges and schools
Portland State University's academic programs are organized into nine major academic units:
 College of Liberal Arts and Sciences - An array of undergraduate, graduate, and certificate programs in over 20 majors, including Anthropology, Applied Linguistics, Biology, Black Studies, Chemistry, Chicano/Latino Studies, Communication, Conflict Resolution, Economics, English, Environmental Programs, Geography, Geology, History, International Studies, Mathematics and Statistics, Native American Studies, Philosophy, Physics, Psychology, Science Education, Sociology, Speech and Hearing Sciences, Women's Studies, and World Languages and Literatures.
 School of Business Administration - Undergraduate and graduate majors include Business Administration, Financial Analysis, International Management, Marketing and Logistics. Postgraduate and certificate programs include Accounting, International Business Studies, and Food Industry Management. The school also offers doctoral programs as part of the Systems Science doctoral program.
 College of Education - Graduate and undergraduate programs in initial and continuing licensure, Education (Early Childhood, Elementary, Middle Level, and High School), Educational Leadership, Counseling and various specializations, endorsements, graduate certificates and professional development programs.
 OHSU-PSU School of Public Health - A joint project with Oregon Health and Science University. Portland State administers the undergraduate programs, which include bachelor's degrees in Applied Health and Fitness or Health Studies, and an Undergraduate Certificate in Human Lactation. OHSU administers the graduate degrees. 
 Maseeh College of Engineering and Computer Science - Undergraduate and graduate programs include Civil, Computer, Electrical, Environmental, and Mechanical Engineering, as well as Computer Science. Graduate programs also include Engineering Management, Manufacturing Engineering, Systems Engineering, Software Engineering, and Technology Management. The school also offers doctoral programs as part of the Systems Science and the Environmental Sciences and Resources doctoral programs.
 College of the Arts - Undergraduate programs include Architecture, Art (with separate programs in Art Practice, Graphic Design and Social Practice), Art History, Arts Studies, Film, Film Studies, Music, Theater Arts, and Dance. Graduate studies include Architecture, Art, Music, Theater Arts, and Secondary Art Education.
 School of Social Work - The school offers programs in Social Work at the undergraduate and graduate levels, Undergraduate Child and Family Studies, and Doctoral social work programs.
 College of Urban and Public Affairs - This college is organized in a series of subsidiary schools focusing on various aspects of Urban and Public Affairs:
 School of Community Health - Undergraduate and graduate studies in Health Studies and Community Health. The school also offers a graduate certificate in Gerontology.
 Mark O. Hatfield School of Government - Undergraduate and graduate studies in Criminology/Criminal Justice, Political Science, and Public Administration. Institutes include the Center for Public Service, Criminal Justice Research Policy Institute, Institute for Nonprofit Management, National Policy Consensus Center, Institute for Tribal Government, and the Center for Turkish Studies.
 Nohad A. Toulan School of Urban Studies and Planning - Undergraduate programs include a major and minor in Community Development, and minors in Real Estate Development and Sustainable Urban Development. Graduate certificates include Real Estate Development, Transportation, and Urban Design. Graduate studies include Urban Studies, as well as Urban and Regional Planning. Institutes include the Center for Urban Studies, Institute of Portland Metropolitan Studies, Center for Population Research Census, Center for Real Estate, and the Center for Transportation Studies.
 University Honors College - This college is the only urban-focused honors college in the country.

In addition, Portland State University, through the School of Extended Studies, offers continuing education and special learning activities, including credit courses, degree-completion programs, distance-learning courses, noncredit community programs, re-licensure, certifications, high school courses, summer programs, and online study.

Undergraduate curriculum

University Studies 

In 1993, PSU comprehensively reformed its undergraduate curriculum with a new curriculum called University Studies that is unique to the institution. The curriculum was conceived to address issues of credit distribution which required students in upper-level courses to enroll in classes outside of their majors. In a 1993 summary report on the reform, it was stated that the University Studies sought to incorporate "'across-the-curriculum' themes including writing, diversity and multiculturalism, ethics, and global studies,"  as well as form a foundation that "includes the capacity and the propensity to engage in inquiry and critical thinking, to use various forms of communication for learning and expression, to gain an awareness of the broader human experience and its environment, and appreciate the responsibilities of persons to themselves, to each other, and to community."

PSU's University Studies curriculum begins with Freshman Inquiry courses, which are interactive and theme-based, and "explore topics and issues using an interdisciplinary approach to show how they can be understood from different perspectives." In these courses, professors are paired with junior and senior level students who assist in leading group discussions, as well as a peer mentor who leads smaller inquiry sessions.

The Sophomore Inquiry courses are heavily communication-based, and are focused on group dialogue as well as presentations and research projects. These courses are designed to allow sophomore students to explore topics that are complementary to their chosen majors.

As students transition into junior level, they are required to enroll in Upper Division Cluster Courses which are more in-depth and focused, as they pertain more closely to the students' chosen majors. Unlike the inquiry courses that make up students' freshmen and sophomore years, the upper-division courses do not feature mentor sessions. The "clusters" from which students choose their courses cover a wide range of disciplines and themes.

During their senior year, while still completing upper-division Cluster Courses, students are also required to complete a six-credit senior capstone project in order to graduate. The capstone integrates class work with community-based work. These projects are integrated with local community organizations, and cover a wide range of issues, from social justice to grantwriting, environmental conservation, youth education, and more. Capstone courses often conclude with a public presentation from the students on their experiences with the community organization or cause which they explored.

The university received national recognition for the program from the U.S. News & World Report, the W.K. Kellogg Foundation, the Corporation for National Service, the Atlantic Foundation, and the Pew Charitable Trust for the innovative pedagogical approach to undergraduate education.

Research

The Carnegie Classification of Institutions of Higher Education ranks Portland State as a university with "higher research activity." The 1.4 million-volume, six-floor Branford Price Millar Library is located in the center of campus, opposite Fariborz Maseeh Hall on Park Avenue, and has several computer labs, technology and faculty reading rooms, and video viewing rooms. Built in 1966 as a rectangular structure, the library's convex wall of glass facing the campus' park blocks was added in 1989 to surround and preserve a large copper beech tree that was planted in 1890.

The Millar Library houses approximately 1,422,427 volumes, 640 print subscriptions, 97,065 accessible electronic books, 2,592,288 microforms, 69,762 maps, and 133,978 audio-visual materials. It is also a repository for federal documents, housing over 400,000 government documents. The Millar Library is open to the public, and allows non-students access to their catalogues of PDF files and published online journals.

Rankings

U.S. News & World Report ranked Portland State as a second tier research university in their 2017 report, but listed it as unranked nationally.
The university is ranked among The Best 376 Colleges in its 2012 edition, "Best in the West",
and as a "College With a Conscience" 
by The Princeton Review. Portland State's MBA (Master's of Business Administration) was ranked in the top 100 by The Princeton Review, who also named Portland State as one of the best institutions in the country for undergraduate education. In 2015, the university ranked at number 16 as one of the "Most Innovative" colleges in the nation.

Portland State University's School of Business Administration is also ranked in surveys, such as The Princeton Review'''s Best 294 Business Schools. U.S. News & World Report currently ranks Portland State University's graduate Urban & Regional Planning Program as the 14th best in the Nation. Planetizen currently ranks the university's graduate Urban & Regional Planning Program, at the Nohad A. Toulan School of Urban Studies and Planning, within the top 25 best urban planning programs in the nation.

Other top programs/colleges at Portland State University include its graduate College of Urban and Public Affairs which is ranked 46th in the nation, its Rehabilitation Counseling and Social Work graduate degrees ranked 23rd and 33rd respectively, its Speech-Language Pathology program is ranked 62nd, as well as its Graduate School of Education is ranked as being among the "Best" by U.S. News & World Report. The university is listed by U.S. News & World Report as having one of The Best Undergraduate Engineering Programs. The Carnegie Foundation ranked PSU as a Top School in Curricular Engagement, Outreach, and Partnerships, and it is ranked as the ninth Best Neighbor Universities.

Aside from academics, Portland State University is world-renowned for its sustainability and green initiatives. PSU has a Gold STARS Rating for Sustainability, is ranked among the Nation's Top Green Schools and has a Top Green Business School ranking by The Princeton Review, it is also home to seven LEED-certified schools.

Campus

The majority of the PSU campus is located across a  section of southwest downtown Portland, in an area known as the University District. The campus is situated against the West Hills, and is bound by Clay Street to the north, Fourth Avenue to the east, Interstate 405 to the south, and 12th Avenue to the west. SW Broadway runs through the center of the campus, where the university's central buildings are located: Lincoln Hall, Cramer Hall, Smith Memorial Student Union, Fariborz Maseeh Hall, and Shattuck Hall; Cramer Hall, Smith Memorial, and Fariborz Maseeh Hall are connected by tunnels on the basement levels, as well as by skybridges on the upper levels, which allows students access between buildings without having to use street sidewalks.

The university's South Park Blocks, situated on the opposite side of the central buildings, run parallel to Park Avenue, and begin at Market Street where Lincoln Hall is located, and end at Shattuck Hall. The northern edge of the PSU campus is eight blocks away from Pioneer Courthouse Square, and four blocks from the Portland Art Museum. The Keller Auditorium is located at the northwestern edge of the campus, on 3rd Ave. and Clay St.

In 2010, the university opened a $62 million Gold LEED (Leadership in Energy and Environmental Design) Certified Student Rec Center. The six-story building houses an aquatics center, climbing wall, basketball/volleyball/badminton courts, an indoor soccer court, a large fitness area, and an outdoor program; it is located in the university's Urban Center, a quadrangle which is also home to the College of Urban and Public Affairs, the university bookstore, and several restaurants; the Portland Streetcar runs west through the center.

The student-managed PSU Film Committee operates the 5th Avenue Cinema, one of the only student operated theaters in the United States. The cinema is open to the public and screens films weekly, with students receiving free admission, and many of the university's film studies courses are held in the screening rooms.

Residence halls

Although largely a commuter school, PSU houses around 3,000 undergraduate and graduate students, and has ten residence halls. Its largest include University Pointe, a sixteen-story apartment building operated by American Campus Communities built in 2011, and Ondine, a fifteen-story high rise. Older residence halls, many of which were originally apartment buildings that were purchased by the university, include Blackstone, built in 1930, and Montgomery Court, built in 1916; other older residence halls include St. Helens Court, built in 1927 and soon to be demolished; the art deco Parkway Manor, built in 1931; and Blumel Hall, built in 1986.

Other residence buildings were constructed post-millennium, including the Stephen Epler Hall (built in 2003) and the Broadway (built in 2004). Further steps toward increasing housing capacity — and university control over its own housing — are being taken with plans for further construction, and with Portland State taking over management of the residence halls it currently owns.

In March 2007, Portland State University took over the managing of the on-campus housing at Portland State University. College Housing Northwest, which has managed the on-campus housing buildings (including the Broadway, Stephen Epler Hall, West Hall, King Albert Hall, St. Helens, Montgomery Court, and Ondine) for over 30 years, will still maintain its off-campus housing (including Goose Hollow, The Palidian, The Cambrian, and Clay).

Greek system
Optional residential and social opportunities exist with a small but active Greek system, which includes:

Art and galleries

Portland State University has numerous pieces of public art around campus from renowned local, national and international artists, such as Frederic Littman, Thomas Hardy, Ken MacKintosh & Lillian Pitt, Emily Ginsburg, Harrell Fletcher with Avalon Kalin, Linda Stein, John Aiken, and Ed Carpenter.

There are several art galleries and spaces for exhibiting art at PSU: the MK Gallery, AB Gallery and Sugar Cube Gallery within PSU's School of Art + Design; the Broadway Gallery in Lincoln Performance Hall; and the Littman + White Galleries in Smith Memorial Student Union. Littman + White Galleries are among the United States' only student-run contemporary art galleries. In 2018, the Autzen Gallery at Neuberger Hall was closed amid restorations for the building, and will be replaced with the Jordan Schnitzer Museum of Art at Portland State University.

Sustainability

The university has made great efforts to make its buildings environmentally sustainable, both in its new architecture as well as through renovation of its older buildings. In September 2008 the James F. and Marion L. Miller Foundation awarded Portland State University a $25 million challenge grant. The grant and the funds raised to match it must be used exclusively for sustainability programs. 
Portland State's sustainability research and education, led by Jennifer Allen, director of the Portland State Institute for Sustainable Solutions, is focused on four primary areas of inquiry: creating sustainable urban communities, the integration of human societies and the natural environment, implementing sustainability and mechanisms of change and measuring sustainability. Since 1998, the Miller Foundation has also contributed more than $5.3 million to Portland State.

, eight buildings on the PSU campus are LEED-certified, two of which are at Platinum status, and the university announced plans for renovations on Neuberger Hall to bring it to LEED certification as well in 2014. Portland State has been named among the most eco-friendly universities in the United States. In addition to the university's eco-conscious architecture and reconstructive work, it has also been recognized for its utilization of mass transit, including light rail, streetcar, and bus systems all central to the campus. It has also been recognized for its abundance of bicycle transportation; in 2013, PSU was ranked one of America's six most bike-friendly universities, third to Stanford University and University of California, Davis.

Outside Shattuck Hall, the university's architecture department constructed the Shattuck Hall Ecological Learning Plaza, a garden featuring green walls, solar panels, and permeable pavement. The university also features its own community garden.

Student life

Student body

Portland State differs from the other universities in Oregon partially because, as an urban institution, it attracts a student body older than other universities; in the 2010–2011 school year, it was reported that the average age of an attending undergraduate student was 26 years. Some programs only offer night classes. PSU also delayed the development of its campus for decades after its founding. The institution sold land in a neighboring block soon after its move to downtown Portland, and delayed the construction of student housing until the early 1970s.

The student government is the Associated Students of Portland State University (ASPSU). In addition to a student body President and Vice President, there is a Student Fee Committee, a 25-member Student Senate, and a Judicial Board which rules on ASPSU constitutional questions. There are also a number of university committees that have student members appointed by the ASPSU President. Portland State also participates in the Oregon Student Association, the statewide student lobbying non-profit.

Publications
The fully student-run newspaper at Portland State is the Portland State Vanguard, established in 1946. Student-run broadcasters run radio station KPSU which is ranked in the Top 20 College Radio Stations by several organizations and is one of only a handful of "Free Format" radio stations in the country, and television station PSU TV. The Portland Review is a literary magazine of poetry, fiction, and art published by PSU's Student Publications Board since 1956. Additional student newspapers at PSU were The Rearguard, an alternative-monthly newspaper, and The Spectrum. Following budget cuts for these publications, they were consolidated into a monthly magazine The Pacific Sentinel'' in January 2016.

Human resources

The university houses a Women's Resources center, a Disability Resources center, a Resource Center for Students with Children, a Queer Resource Center for LGBT students, and a Veteran's Resource Center.

Fraternities and sororities at Portland State University are represented by a student-run group called "Greek Life" or "Greek Council". The council's purpose is to facilitate between the university and the Greek Community on campus, provide a venue for communication between individual Chapters, and to facilitate socials, fundraisers, and other philanthropic events. The council is made up of six executive offices (President, Vice President, Secretary, Treasurer, Special Events Chair, and Public Relations) and represents the following Greek Organizations to date: Alpha Kappa Alpha, Alpha Kappa Psi, Alpha Phi Alpha, Alpha Chi Omega, Kappa Sigma, Omega Delta Phi and Phi Delta Theta.

Transportation

The university contains four parking structures for automobiles: two located on 6th Avenue; one on 12th Street at the northwestern edge of the campus; and one 5th Avenue between Montgomery and Harrison Streets. A guest parking lot is located on the south end of Shattuck Hall.

Portland State University is serviced with mass transit by TriMet, which includes fifteen bus lines as well as the MAX light rail system. The MAX Green Line, MAX Yellow Line, and Portland Streetcar all service the university, with numerous stops located within the campus. The Green Line runs to the southernmost point of the university, at the PSU South MAX Station, located at SW 6th & College; the north-bound Yellow Line stop is at 5th & Jackson. Both lines have stops at PSU Urban Center stations, which is located at the center of the campus. The Urban Center plaza also has connections to the Portland Streetcar's NS Line as well as TriMet buses.

There are also shuttles available through Oregon Health & Science University and Portland Community College on SW Harrison Street at SW Broadway. In addition to use of mass transit, the university also has a large population of students who travel by bicycle.

Athletics

Portland State competes at the NCAA Division I level in football, basketball, women's volleyball, golf, soccer, tennis, softball, indoor and outdoor track and field, and cross country as a member of the Big Sky Conference. The football team competes in Division I FCS (Football Championship Subdivision).

Prior to joining Division I, the school won NCAA National Division II championships in women's volleyball and wrestling. The school has also placed second twice nationally in football and once in women's basketball at the Division II level.

Portland State's colors are green and white, and its mascot is the Viking personified as "Victor E. Viking". Among the two more notable former Portland State athletes are Freeman Williams and Neil Lomax. Williams was the NCAA Division I national men's basketball individual scoring leader in 1977 and 1978. Lomax was a record-setting quarterback who went on to star for the St. Louis Cardinals in the NFL in the mid-1980s. Football's "Run & Shoot" offense was first implemented at the college level at PSU by coach Darryl "Mouse" Davis. An assistant coach at Portland State, Davis took over as head coach in 1975 following the departure of Ron Stratten. Behind his revolutionary new "Run-and-Shoot" offense (developed in the late 1960s at Hillsboro (OR) HS) and a strong-armed quarterback named June Jones, Davis led the Viking program to new heights— an 8–3 record, including a perfect 5–0 home mark. Davis' quarterback protégés were Lomax and Jones.

Home games for football are held off-campus at Hillsboro Stadium, and home games for basketball are held on-campus in the Viking Pavilion. In 2008, the men's basketball team earned their first ever bid into the NCAA tournament.

The university has 30 student-managed club sports on campus including the PSU Rugby Club, the PSU Ice Hockey Club and the PSU Lacrosse Club. In addition, the Student Activities and Leadership Program sponsors 120 student clubs including the Tango, Fencing, Medieval and Brewers' clubs.

Alumni and faculty

Notable alumni

The university has several alumni in law and government, including Barbara Roberts, the 34th Governor of Oregon, U.S. Federal Judge Anna J. Brown, and American diplomats Joseph LeBaron and Marisa Lino. Betty Roberts, the first woman to serve on the Oregon Supreme Court, and Margaret Carter, the first African American woman elected to the Oregon House of Representatives, are also graduates of the university. Casten Nemra, the seventh president of the Republic of the Marshall Islands, and Arnold I. Palacios the 12th Lt. Governor of the Commonwealth of the Northern Mariana Islands are graduates of Portland State University as well.

Portland State has produced many academics across the sciences and humanities; alumni include: cultural anthropologist and professor at Duke University Lee D. Baker; Michael Kazin, historian and professor at Georgetown University; Dali Yang, professor of political science at the University of Chicago; Thomas Talbott, professor of philosophy at Willamette University; and Hans G. Furth, professor of psychology at The Catholic University of America.

Businessman and engineer Norm Winningstad, United Parcel Service CEO D. Scott Davis, and Judi Hofer, executive CEO of The May Department Stores Company are also graduates. Business magnate and co-founder and chairman of Nike, Inc., Phil Knight was an assistant professor of business at the university, and his son, animator and CEO of Laika, Travis Knight, is an alumnus. Carolyn Davidson, an alumnus of the university's visual arts department, invented the Nike swoosh while she was a student there. Tarah Wheeler, cybersecurity executive and author of Women In Tech, received her MS in Political Science from the Hatfield School.

Writer Francisco Laguna Correa; poets Michael Dickman and John Sibley Williams; and novelists Deborah J. Ross and David James Duncan are among the university's alumni; Mike Richardson, publisher and founder of Dark Horse Comics, is an alumnus as well. In 2007, Dark Horse donated copies of all of its published works to the PSU Library, which maintains both a browsing collection of book titles, in addition to a research collection which also includes every "print, poster, statue, figure, and all other products."

In the sciences, the university's alumni base include computer scientist and Turing Award winner Ivan Sutherland, theoretical physicist Mohammad Aslam Khan Khalil, autism researcher Paul Shattuck, and Antarctic researcher Jill Mikucki. Several social activists are among alumni as well, including British political scientist and peace-building initiative pioneer Harry Anastasiou; Native American activist Robert Robideau; gay rights activist Paul Popham, who founded the Gay Men's Health Crisis in New York City and social activist and recipient of the Director's Community Leadership Award (DCLA) Musse Olol.

The university's contribution to performing arts and entertainment include actors Mark Dacascos and Terence Knox; four-time Grammy Award-winning jazz musician Esperanza Spalding; film composer Rob Simonsen; and Jack Ely, guitarist of The Kingsmen. Emmy-winning writer, stand-up comedian, and fantasy draft expert; Ian Karmel. Alternative rock singer and guitarist Courtney Love of Hole also attended the university, but did not graduate.

Sportsmen who attended Portland State include football players Adam Heyward, Tony Curtis, Super Bowl XLVIII Champion DeShawn Shead, Julius Thomas, two-time Super Bowl Champion (XVII, XXII) Clint Didier, Dave Stief, and Neil Lomax. Freeman Williams, who has the second-highest NCAA score in NBA history, is also an alumnus.

Notable current and former faculty

Notes

References

Further reading

External links 

 
 Portland State University Athletics website

 
Universities and colleges accredited by the Northwest Commission on Colleges and Universities
Educational institutions established in 1946
1946 establishments in Oregon
Universities and colleges in Portland, Oregon
Public universities and colleges in Oregon